This is a list of Dutch television related events from 1984.

Events
14 March - Maribelle is selected to represent Netherlands at the 1984 Eurovision Song Contest with her song "Ik hou van jou". She is selected to be the twenty-ninth Dutch Eurovision entry during Nationaal Songfestival held at NOS Studios in Hilversum.

Debuts

Television shows

1950s
NOS Journaal (1956–present)

1970s
Sesamstraat (1976–present)

1980s
Jeugdjournaal (1981–present)

Ending this year

Births
7 April - Rick Brandsteder, TV presenter & model
14 August - Nicolette van Dam, actress & TV presenter

Deaths